Pargi is a town and municipality in the Vikarabad district of the Indian state of Telangana. It is located in Parigi mandal of Parigi division

Geography 
It relies entirely on ground water, but has an ample supply of it, sustaining a farming industry exploiting its fertile, black soil. The major crops are cotton, maize, and Jowar, and there are also many mango groves.

Parigi has recently been recognised as a municipal corporation by the government of Telangana, Tirumala and Jersey.

Location 
Parigi is located some 66 km west of Hyderabad, and is 60 km from the city's outer ring road, 66 km from Shamshabad Airport, 38 km from Shadnagar, 36 km from Chevella and 18 km from Vikarabad.

Transport links

Road 
The town is accessible via the new Hyderabad-Bijapur-Goa  National Highway NH-163. The NH-44 Link road passes by Pargi-Shadnagar.

Rail 
The nearest railway stations are Vikarabad Railway Junction (about 18 km away), Shadnagar Station (about 38 km away) and Hyderabad Deccan(nampally) (about 76 km away).

Air 
The nearest airport is Rajiv Gandhi International Airport-Hyderabad, about 67 km away.

References 

Villages in Vikarabad district
Mandal headquarters in Vikarabad district